Allde is a surname. Notable people with the surname include:

Edward Allde (died 1628), English printer
John Allde (fl. 1555–1592), Scottish stationer and printer